The Glacier station (in Glacier National Park, Canada) was built by the Canadian Pacific Railway (CPR).  The small, one-storey, log railway station was completed in 1916 and is located at the western end of the Connaught Tunnel.
The building was designated a Heritage Railway station in 1992.

History
A first station using this name was built close to the Glacier House Hotel, near the Illecillewaet Glacier. With the opening of the Connaught Tunnel in 1916 and the relocation of the track, "Glacier station was also moved from the Glacier House location to a new site just west of the tunnel".

Trains along the line were kept light to make the climb into the mountains easier. As such, dining stations were built along the line instead of running the trains with dining cars. "Special hotels with large dining rooms were built at Glacier, Field and North Bend" to serve hungry passengers.

By 1994, the station was used as a temporary storehouse for the railway.

As of the 21st century, the CPR had little use for the station, which has fallen into disrepair. Rainwater entered the roof and by 2021 the station was near collapse. The railway took some measures to prevent collapse of the structure onto the mainline by June 2021, with little else in the way of preservation of the structure.

References 

Designated Heritage Railway Stations in British Columbia
Railway stations in Canada opened in 1916
Disused railway stations in Canada
Railway stations in British Columbia